Figure skating at the 2003 Asian Winter Games took place in the Aomori Prefectural Skating Rink located in Aomori City, Japan with four events contested.

The competition took place from 2 to 4 February 2003.

Schedule

Medalists

Medal table

Participating nations
A total of 45 athletes from 7 nations competed in figure skating at the 2003 Asian Winter Games:

References
Results
Results

External links
Results of the Fifth Winter Asian Games

 
2003 Asian Winter Games events
2003
2003 in figure skating
International figure skating competitions hosted by Japan